Michelle Lock (born 29 March 1967) is an Australian sprinter. She competed in the women's 400 metres at the 1992 Summer Olympics.

References

External links
 

1967 births
Living people
Athletes (track and field) at the 1992 Summer Olympics
Australian female sprinters
Olympic athletes of Australia
Place of birth missing (living people)
Olympic female sprinters